Carlos Sala Molera (born 20 March 1960 in Barcelona, Catalonia), nicknamed "Charli", is a retired Spanish sprint hurdler. He represented his country at five consecutive Summer Olympics starting in 1980. His best result at the Games is the 7th place in 1984.

His personal best time was 13.44 seconds, achieved in August 1987 in Barcelona.

Competition record

Notes

References

External links
 
 
 

1960 births
Living people
Athletes from Catalonia
Spanish male hurdlers
Athletes (track and field) at the 1980 Summer Olympics
Athletes (track and field) at the 1984 Summer Olympics
Athletes (track and field) at the 1988 Summer Olympics
Athletes (track and field) at the 1992 Summer Olympics
Athletes (track and field) at the 1996 Summer Olympics
Olympic athletes of Spain
Athletes from Barcelona
European Athletics Championships medalists
Mediterranean Games silver medalists for Spain
Mediterranean Games medalists in athletics
Athletes (track and field) at the 1979 Mediterranean Games
Athletes (track and field) at the 1983 Mediterranean Games
Athletes (track and field) at the 1991 Mediterranean Games